Exchange is a split album by American ska punk band Against All Authority and the punk rock band, The Criminals. It was first released in 1999 on Sub City Records.

Track listing
Against All Authority
"The Bottle's Lookin' Better"
"WWYD?"
"I Want to Stab You With Something Rusty" (The Criminals Cover)
"Wet Foot Policy"
The Criminals
"All Fall Down" (AAA cover)
"Five Years On"
"Down and Out"

Against All Authority albums
The Criminals albums
1999 EPs
Split EPs